Cleo Finch is a fictional character from the NBC television series ER. The role was portrayed by Michael Michele from the sixth season episode, "Leave It to Weaver", aired on September 30, 1999, until the eighth season episode, "I'll Be Home for Christmas", aired on December 13, 2001.

Later in the eighth season, Michele would make a guest appearance in the episode "On the Beach", aired on May 9, 2002.

Early life 
Dr. Cleo Finch was first introduced at the start of Season 6 as a skilled new pediatric fellow at County.  She was portrayed as a hard-working, no-nonsense doctor who often jogged to work.
Dr. Finch took over most of the pediatric story-lines left void by the departures of George Clooney and Maria Bello (pediatric doctors Doug Ross and Anna Del Amico, respectively) and was portrayed as a generally competent doctor. She had a tough time early in Season 6 when she was distracted by a loud, bratty obnoxious young girl and didn't diagnose the iron poisoning that led to the girl's death. Later on, that year in “How The Finch Stole Christmas," Cleo separated a young alcoholic patient from his alcoholic mother, who fed his addiction, during Christmastime. When no surgeons were available to perform a laparotomy on a dying patient in the aftermath of a stabbing in the ER, Dr. Finch performed an emergency thoracotomy in the OR to stabilize the patient until a surgeon could be found.  She was at first reprimanded by Dr. Peter Benton, her boyfriend at the time, but he later apologized, blaming the stress of performing surgery on his friend, Dr. John Carter, a victim of the stabbing. Cleo barely responded and looked completely stunned and sorrowful, leading Peter to ask her what was wrong and her to brokenly tell him what had happened to Lucy Knight. She seemed vaguely annoyed that Dr. Carter was welcomed back to County after he went to rehab for his prescription medication addiction between Seasons 6 and 7 and briefly became angered by some issues she felt were racially tinged in Season 7, but neither storyline was maintained for very long.

Relationships
During the course of Season 6, Cleo started a relationship with Dr. Peter Benton.  She got along well with Peter's deaf son Reese, impressing Peter with her knowledge of ASL.  Cleo often clashed with Reese's mother Carla, who saw Cleo as interfering in her family's decisions and also made an unsuccessful attempt to seduce Peter. While under Cleo's care, Reese accidentally injured his hand on a piano, leading Carla to claim she was untrustworthy and irresponsible.  Cleo's relationship with Peter was also put under strain when Peter felt that Cleo's bi-racial background prevented her from understanding the medical and cultural needs of the African-American community. 
Despite their problems, Cleo and Peter stayed together, allowing Cleo to help Peter through a difficult child-custody battle with Roger, Carla's husband, following Carla's death.  Cleo took the stand to testify that she hoped to play an important role in both Peter and Reese's lives.

Season 8 and Beyond
In Season 8, Cleo left County for a job at a private hospital just outside Chicago. After winning his custody battle over Reese, Peter also departed the ER to work at the same hospital as Cleo.  Their final appearance as regular characters was in the episode “I’ll be Home for Christmas,” in which they are shown helping Reese decorate a Christmas Tree.

Michael Michele reprised her role as Dr. Finch in the Season 8 episode "On the Beach," at Mark Greene’s funeral, along with Eriq La Salle.

During the 15th and final season of ER, at the end of the episode "The Book of Abby", long-serving nurse Haleh Adams shows the departing Abby Lockhart a closet wall where all the past doctors and employees have put their locker name tags. Amongst them, the tag "Finch" can be seen.

Later appearances by Dr. Benton in Season 15 suggested that Cleo and Peter had gotten married and were raising Reese together. Michele did not appear in any of those episodes.

Notes

ER (TV series) characters
Television characters introduced in 1999
Fictional female doctors
Fictional pediatricians
Fictional African-American people